Þórir Guðmundur Þorbjarnarson (born 26 May 1998) is an Icelandic professional basketball player for Oviedo CB of the LEB Oro. He played college basketball for the Nebraska Cornhuskers. Nicknamed "Tóti Túrbó", he has won the Icelandic championship three times and the Icelandic Basketball Cup twice.

Career

Early career with KR (2014–2017)
Þórir came up through the junior ranks of KR and played his first senior game, at the age of 16, on 7 December 2014, when he scored 31 points against Haukar-b in the Icelandic Basketball Cup. During the 2015–2016 season he was named the best young player of the first half of the season. He developed into a key player for KR during its 2017 championship run, averaging 10.2 points, 2.6 rebounds and 1.9 assists per game, and was named the Úrvalsdeild Young Player of the Year after the 2016–17 season.

Nebraska (2017–2021)

In August, 2017, Þórir joined the University of Nebraska.
 
On 8 January 2020, he tied his career high with Nebraska after scoring 17 points in a 76–70 win against Iowa.

Return to KR (2021)
At the conclusion of his college career, Þórir rejoined KR in April 2021. He appeared in six regular seasons games, averaging 6.7 points, 4.0 rebounds and 3.0 assists, scoring a season high 18 points in a 96-85 victory against Stjarnan on 6 May. In the best-of-five first round of the playoffs, KR faced Reykjavík rivals Valur. In game five of the series, Þórir scored 15 points in the narrow 89-86 win. KR was eliminated semi-finals 0-3 against first seeded Keflavík. In the playoffs, Þórir averaged 8.3 points, 5.1 rebounds and 1.5 assists in 8 games.

He started the following season with KR. On 12 November he posted 28 points, 15 rebounds and 8 assists in an overtime victory against Stjarnan in the Úrvalsdeild. In 8 Úrvalsdeild games he averaged 15.9 points, 10.5 rebounds and 4.8 assists per game.

Landstede Hammers (2021–2022)
On December 6, 2021, Þórir signed with Landstede Hammers of the BNXT League. He made his debut on December 8, in an away game against Aris Leeuwarden.

Oviedo CB (2022–present)
In August 2022, Þórir signed with Oviedo CB of the Spanish LEB Oro.

National team career
In June 2016, Þórir helped Iceland's U-18 team win the Nordic championship and for his performance, he was named to the tournaments All-first team. Þórir was a member of Iceland's U-20 team that finished 8th at the 2017 FIBA Europe Under-20 Championship. He was selected for the senior national team for the first time prior to its games at the 2017 Games of the Small States of Europe in San Marino. He played five games during the tournament and helped Iceland finish third.

Career statistics

College

|-
| style="text-align:left;"| 2017–18
| style="text-align:left;"| Nebraska
| 9 || 0 || 2.1 || .429 || .400 || – || .4 || .3 || .1 || .0 || .9
|-
| style="text-align:left;"| 2018–19
| style="text-align:left;"| Nebraska
| 25 || 7 || 12.2 || .339 || .174 || .667 || 2.1 || 1.2 || .6 || .2 || 2.0
|-
| style="text-align:left;"| 2019–20
| style="text-align:left;"| Nebraska
| 32 || 24 || 29.2 || .452 || .372 || .780 || 4.8 || 1.3 || 1.1 || .1 || 8.8
|-
| style="text-align:left;"| 2020–21
| style="text-align:left;"| Nebraska
| 27 || 12 || 22.1 || .342 || .294 || .769 || 3.1 || 1.7 || .9 || .1 || 3.9
|-
|- class="sortbottom"
| style="text-align:center;" colspan="2"| Career
| 93 || 43 || 20.0 || .405 || .329 || .758 || 3.1 || 1.3 || .8 || .1 || 4.8

Awards, titles and accomplishments

Club career

Individual awards
Úrvalsdeild Young Player of the Year: 2017

Titles
Icelandic champion (3): 2015, 2016, 2017
Icelandic Basketball Cup (2): 2016, 2017
Icelandic Supercup: 2015
Icelandic Company Cup: 2014

National team

Individual awards
U-18 Nordic championships All-first team: 2016

Titles
U-18 Nordic championships winner: 2016

References

External links
Icelandic statistics at Icelandic Basketball Association
Nebraska Cornhuskers bio

1998 births
Living people
Furman Paladins men's basketball players
Icelandic expatriate basketball people in the United States
Thorir Thorbjarnarson
Thorir Thorbjarnarson
Landstede Hammers players
Nebraska Cornhuskers men's basketball players
Shooting guards
Thorir Thorbjarnarson
Thorir Thorbjarnarson